Loni railway station is a small railway station in Pune district, Maharashtra. Its code is LONI. It serves Loni Kalbhor, a suburban area of the city. The station consist of two platforms. The platforms are not well sheltered. It lacks many facilities including water and sanitation. The main railway station of the city, Pune Junction is always preferred over Loni station for catching several trains. This station is only suitable for local travelling within Pune City. There is also plan to start suburban trains on Pune – Daund section. This station will be a major station for Pune -Daund suburban trains.

Trains

Trains passing through Manjari:

 Pune–Baramati Passenger
 Pune–Baramati–Daund–Pune Passenger
 Pune–Daund Passenger
 Pune–Daund Passenger
 Pune–Daund Fast Passenger
 Pune–Manmad Passenger
 Pune–Nizamabad Passenger
 Pune–Solapur Passenger
 Pune–Solapur Passenger

See also
 
 
 
 Pune Suburban Railway

References

Pune Suburban Railway
Railway stations in Pune
Pune railway division
Railway stations in Pune district